Guto de Faria (born 11 March 1975) is a Brazilian equestrian. He competed in the team eventing at the 2000 Summer Olympics.

References

External links
 

1975 births
Living people
Brazilian male equestrians
Olympic equestrians of Brazil
Equestrians at the 2000 Summer Olympics
Sportspeople from São Paulo
Pan American Games medalists in equestrian
Pan American Games bronze medalists for Brazil
Equestrians at the 2003 Pan American Games
Medalists at the 2003 Pan American Games
21st-century Brazilian people
20th-century Brazilian people